Javorník may refer to places in the Czech Republic:

Javorník (Benešov District), a municipality and village in the Central Bohemian Region
Javorník (Hodonín District), a municipality and village in the South Bohemian Region
Javorník (Jeseník District), a town in the Olomouc Region
Javorník (Svitavy District), a municipality and village in the Pardubice Region
Javorník (Ústí nad Orlicí District), a municipality and village in the Pardubice Region
Javorník, a village and part of Čtyřkoly in the Central Bohemian Region
Javorník, a village and part of Proseč pod Ještědem in the Liberec Region
Javorník, a village and part of Rudník (Trutnov District) in the Hradec Králové Region
Javorník, a village and part of Vacov in the South Bohemian Region

See also
Javornik (disambiguation) (without a diacritic í), the name of several locations in Croatia and Slovenia
Jawornik (disambiguation), the names of several locations in Poland
Jaworznik
Javor (disambiguation)